Nasrullah may refer to:
 Nasrullah (horse) (1940–1959), British Thoroughbred racehorse
 Nasrullah (name), a name (including a list of people with the name)
 Nasrullah Bridge, a 16th-century bridge in Kastamonu, Turkey
 Nasrullah Mosque, a 16th-century mosque in Kastamonu, Turkey

See also
 Nasrallah
 Nasrallah, Tunisia, a city in the Kairouan Governorate